The Ministry of Youth and Sports is a ministry responsible for sports and athletics-related provisions within Somalia. The current Minister of Youth and Sports is Mohamed Barre Mohamud.

See also
 Agriculture in Somalia

References

Government ministries of Somalia